Two Bootle by-elections were held during 1990, for the House of Commons constituency of Bootle in Merseyside.

Bootle was one of the Labour Party's safest seats, having held the seat since 1945.

May by-election

The first by-election was caused by the death of Labour MP Allan Roberts, on 21 March 1990. Roberts had held the seat since the 1979 general election, and his majority had remained over 15,000 votes; even at the 1983 general election, which was a landslide victory for the Conservative Party. At the 1987 general election, Roberts' majority had increased to almost 25,000 votes.

For the by-election, Labour selected Michael Carr, a full-time official for the Transport and General Workers Union, and a former Labour Party councillor. The Conservatives, who had consistently taken second place in the seat but was struggling in the national polls, nominated James Clappison, a barrister from Yorkshire. He had unsuccessfully contested Barnsley East for the Conservative Party in 1987, and the South Yorkshire constituency at the 1989 European Parliament election.

The newly named Liberal Democrats had suffered in the national polls since their formation by a merger of the Liberal Party and the Social Democratic Party (SDP), and in Bootle they were challenged by both David Owen's continuing Social Democratic Party and Michael Meadowcroft's continuing Liberal Party, each consisting of members of the former SDP–Liberal Alliance parties who had rejected their merger.

The Green Party also nominated a candidate. Screaming Lord Sutch of the Official Monster Raving Loony Party and an independent rounded out the field.

The Loonies gained publicity after the Labour Party election agent unsuccessfully tried to get Sutch charged with having a public house as an election campaign headquarters. This had not been illegal since 1987.

The election was held on 24 May. Despite having to contend with a large field of candidates, Carr increased the Labour vote, to win with more than three-quarters of all the votes cast. The Conservative vote halved, although they retained second place, as the Liberal Democrat vote could not match that of the SDP–Liberal Alliance in 1987. The Greens polled 3.6%, while the continuing Liberals fared poorly, and the continuing Social Democrats were beaten even by the Monster Raving Loonies. Sutch jokingly offered to form a coalition with them, and the party was wound up soon afterwards, but Holmes formed yet another Social Democratic Party of members who wished to continue.

November by-election

Carr died on 20 July, only 57 days after his by-election victory. A second by-election was called for 8 November.

Labour nominated Joe Benton, the leader of Sefton Borough Council, a local Justice of the Peace and a personnel manager with Girobank. All the other parties nominated the same candidates as in May, except for the Social Democratic Party which did not participate (neither did the independent Schofield). The only addition to the field was David Black, a candidate in the previous year's Vauxhall and Vale of Glamorgan by-elections, standing as "Christian Alliance".

On a low turnout of 39.7%, Benton increased the Labour Party majority again, taking 78.2% of the vote. The Conservative vote held steady, while all the other parties fell back. This allowed the Loonies to overtake the continuing Liberal Party.

Benton remained as the Member of Parliament for Bootle until he retired in 2015, while Clappison was elected in 1992 for Hertsmere; he too retired in 2015.

References

See also 
 1911 Bootle by-election

Bootle by-elections
Bootle by-elections
1990s in Merseyside
By-elections to the Parliament of the United Kingdom in Merseyside constituencies
Politics of the Metropolitan Borough of Sefton
Bootle by-elections
Bootle by-elections
Bootle